Meu Testamento is a Portuguese-language novel by Brazilian author, Oswald de Andrade. It was first published in 1944.

References

1944 Brazilian novels
Portuguese-language novels
Novels by Oswald de Andrade